Orthotospovirus is a genus of negative-strand RNA viruses, in the family Tospoviridae of the order Bunyavirales, which infects plants. Tospoviruses take their name from the species Tomato spotted wilt orthotospovirus (TSWV) which was discovered in Australia in 1919. TSWV remained the only known member of the family until the early 1990s when genetic characterisation of plant viruses became more common. There are now at least twenty species in the genus with more being discovered on a regular basis. Member viruses infect over eight hundred plant species from 82 different families.

Genome
Tospoviruses have a negative-sense, single-strand RNA genome.  The genome resembles that of the genus Phlebovirus.  It is linear and is 17.2 kb in size.  It is divided into three segments termed S (2.9kb), M (5.4kb), and L (8.9kb).  The M and S RNA segments encode for proteins in an ambisense direction.

Transmission
Tospoviruses are arboviruses usually vectored by thrips. At least ten species of thrips belonging to family Thripidae have been confirmed as vectors for the transmission of thirteen or more tospoviruses. The thrips vectors are not closely related, implying an independent origin of infection for each thrips, possibly transmitted horizontally through shared hosts. There may be other species of thrips competent to transmit similar viruses, but they have not been documented on crops of economic significance.

Recent research concludes that thrips can only be infected by tospovirus during the larval phases of development, as pupation and metamorphosis separate the connection between the salivary glands and the infected muscle tissue of the mid-gut. Adults transmit the virus from infected salivary glands, and uninfected adults will not transmit the virus. Obviously, controlling the infection by limiting transmission from infected plants to larval thrips or by preventing adult dispersal from infected plants are key strategies in preventing an epidemic of the disease.

Agricultural importance
Infection with these viruses results in spotting and wilting of the plant, reduced vegetative output, and eventually death. No antiviral cures have been developed for plants infected with a Tospovirus, and infected plants should be removed from a field and destroyed in order to prevent the spread of the disease.

A large number of plant families are known to be affected by viruses of the Tospovirus genus. These include both food crops (such as peanuts, watermelons, capsicums, tomatoes, zucchinis, et al.) as well as ornamental species which are important to flower farms (calla lily, impatiens, chrysanthemums, iris, et al.). For a more complete list of hosts examine the Tospovirus host list at Kansas State University.

Diagnosis
Early symptoms of infection are difficult to diagnose.  In young infected plants the characteristic symptoms consist of inward cupping of leaves and leaves that develop a bronze cast followed by dark spots.  As the infection progresses additional symptoms develop which include dark streaks on the main stem and wilting of the top portion of the plant.  Fruit may be deformed, show uneven ripening and often have raised bumps on the surface.  Once a plant becomes infected the disease cannot be controlled.

Serological and molecular tests are commercially available to diagnose TSWV as well as a second common tospovirus found in ornamentals, Impatiens necrotic spot virus (INSV).  Cytological studies of TSWV and INSV have shown that these viruses produce granular inclusions in the cytoplasm of infected plants.  These inclusions can be seen in the light microscope with proper staining techniques.  These inclusions can be diagnostic.

Epidemiology
Tospoviruses are prevalent in warm climates in regions with a high population of thrips. For instance TSWV is an agricultural pest in Asia, America, Europe and Africa.  Over the past 15 years outbreaks of Tomato spotted wilt disease have become more prevalent in these regions.  Therefore, TSWV is described as an emerging viral disease of plants.  The increased prevalence is largely because of the successful survival of the thrips vector Frankliniella occidentalis.  Another thrips, Scirtothrips dorsalis, has also been implicated in the transmission of at least three tospoviruses, but there remains some controversy over its efficiency as a vector. Immunological testing and vector-competence studies suggest that S. dorsalis may represents a non-transmitting carrier for some strains of virus.

The success of this virus has also been attributed to the acquisition of a gene in the M segment of the genome which encodes a movement protein.  This protein allows the virus to infect a wide range of hosts.  The gene encoding this protein was likely acquired by recombination from either a plant host or from another plant virus.

Management
Control of these diseases is difficult.  One of the reasons for this is that the wide host range allows the viruses to successfully overseason from one crop to the next.  To prevent spread of the virus infected plants should be immediately removed away from neighbouring plants.  Control of insects, especially thrips, is important to reduce spread of the virus by vectors.

Taxonomy

The following species are recognized:

Alstroemeria necrotic streak orthotospovirus
Alstroemeria yellow spot orthotospovirus
Bean necrotic mosaic orthotospovirus
Calla lily chlorotic spot orthotospovirus
Capsicum chlorosis orthotospovirus
Chrysanthemum stem necrosis orthotospovirus
Groundnut bud necrosis orthotospovirus
Groundnut chlorotic fan spot orthotospovirus
Groundnut ringspot orthotospovirus
Groundnut yellow spot orthotospovirus
Hippeastrum chlorotic ringspot orthotospovirus
Impatiens necrotic spot orthotospovirus
Iris yellow spot orthotospovirus
Melon severe mosaic orthotospovirus
Melon yellow spot orthotospovirus
Mulberry vein banding associated orthotospovirus
Pepper chlorotic spot orthotospovirus
Polygonum ringspot orthotospovirus
Soybean vein necrosis orthotospovirus
Tomato chlorotic spot orthotospovirus
Tomato spotted wilt orthotospovirus
Tomato yellow ring orthotospovirus
Tomato zonate spot orthotospovirus
Watermelon bud necrosis orthotospovirus
Watermelon silver mottle orthotospovirus
Zucchini lethal chlorosis orthotospovirus

Resources
 The Complete Tospovirus Resource Page at KSU
 Tospoviruses:Bunyaviridae from Plant Viruses online
 Plant Viruses Online – Tomato Spotted Wilt tospovirus
 APSnet A Plant Disease Lesson on Tomato spotted wilt virus
 Raccah. B (2000).  Plant Virus Transmission by Insects. In: Encyclopedia of Life Sciences. John Wiley & Sons, Ltd: Chichester. www.els.net 
 ICTVdB - The Universal Virus Database: Tomato spotted Cake virus
 Family Groups - The Baltimore Method
 Tospoviruses (Family Bunyaviridae, Genus Tospovirus) An article by Scott Adkins, Tom Zitter and Tim Momol.

References

Further reading

External links

 Viralzone: Tospovirus
 Virus Pathogen Database and Analysis Resource (ViPR): Bunyaviridae

Tospoviridae
Tomato diseases
Viral plant pathogens and diseases
Virus genera